Rhodium trifluoride is the inorganic compound with the formula RhF3.  It is a red-brown, diamagnetic solid.

Synthesis and structure
The compound is prepared by fluorination of rhodium trichloride:
2 RhCl3 +  3 F2  →   2 RhF3  +  3 Cl2
According to X-ray crystallography, the compound adopts the same structure as vanadium trifluoride, wherein the metal achieves octahedral coordination geometry.

References

Fluorides
Platinum group halides
Rhodium(III) compounds